Lakemont Park is an amusement park located in Altoona, Pennsylvania. It houses the world's oldest-surviving roller coaster, the Leap-The-Dips. On June 19, 1996, the roller coaster was added to the list of National Historic Landmarks by the National Park Service. The park opened in 1894 as a trolley park and became an amusement park in summer 1899. It is one of only thirteen trolley parks still operating, and the 8th-oldest amusement park in the United States. The park was owned by the Boyer Candy Company from May 23, 1986, until July 1, 1988, when it was called Boyertown USA. The park was closed from 2017 to 2018, but re-opened in summer 2019. The park is located next to Peoples Natural Gas Field, home of the Altoona Curve Minor League Baseball team.

Lakemont Park is also known for its 51-acre drive-through holiday light display, Holiday Lights on the Lake.

History

Lakemont Park opened in 1894, was donated to Blair County in 1937, privatized in 1986, and remained in operation through 2016. The park closed at the beginning of the 2017 season, as many rides and attractions were undergoing maintenance.  In 2018, Lakemont Park announced that it would remain closed with plans to reopen as a "family entertainment location with some amusements" in the summer of 2019. Lakemont indicated it is planning on selling most of the rides except for Skyliner, Leap the Dips, Tin Lizzy Antique Cars, C.P. Huntington Train, Paddle Boats, Indy Go-Karts, 4x4 Monster Trucks, Lil’ Leaper, and the Waterpark.  The park reopened in the summer of 2019.

Current rides and attractions

Lakemont Park has numerous outdoor attractions.

Roller coasters

Other Family Rides and Attractions
 Paddle Boats
 Tin Lizzy Antique Cars
 Motorway Go-Karts
 C.P. Huntington Train
 Batting Cages (4)
 Keystone Falls Mini Golf (18 Hole)
 Rabbit Hole Mini Golf (18 Hole)
 Basketball Courts (4)
 Volley Ball Courts (2)
 Corn Hole Boards
 Horseshoe Pits
 Walking Paths

Kiddie Rides and Attractions
 4X4 Monster Trucks
 C.P. Huntington Train
 Lil' Leaper
 Playground

Water park

Former attractions

Like any amusement park that has been open for many years, rides are removed for various reasons. Below is a list of some of these rides.

Former roller coasters

Incidents at Lakemont Park 
 On September 2, 1991, a seventeen-year-old ride operator for the Little Leaper Coaster named Chris Whitfield got dragged away by the roller coaster and lost his right leg after it got mangled between the train and its track/chain. The accident was featured on the television series Rescue 911 on September 29, 1992 on CBS.

References

External links
Park website
Park Facebook page

Rescue 911

1894 establishments in Pennsylvania
Buildings and structures in Altoona, Pennsylvania
Amusement parks in Pennsylvania
Tourist attractions in Blair County, Pennsylvania
Altoona, Pennsylvania